This is a list of colleges and universities located in Yangon, Myanmar. All universities in Myanmar are state-run.

Universities
 Co-operative University, Thanlyin
 Defence Services Medical Academy
 Dagon University
 East Yangon University
 Myanmar Maritime University
 Technological University (Hmawbi)
 Technological University (Thanlyin)
 University of Computer Studies, Yangon
 University of Culture, Yangon
 University of Dental Medicine, Yangon
 University of Distance Education, Yangon
 University of Foreign Languages, Yangon
 University of Information Technology, Yangon
 University of Medicine-1, Yangon
 University of Medicine-2, Yangon
 University of Paramedical Science, Yangon
 University of Pharmacy, Yangon
 West Yangon Technological University
 West Yangon University
 Yangon Institute of Economics
 Yangon Institute of Education
 Yangon Institute of Marine Technology
 Yangon Institute of Nursing
 Yangon Technological University
 Yangon University
 Yangon University of Economics

Colleges
 Myanmar Institute of Theology
 Thingangyun Education College
 Yankin Education College
 Mary Chapman College for Teachers and School for the Deaf
 National Management Degree College (Botahtaung)

Yangon
Universities and colleges in Myanmar
Universities
Universities